The Costa Rica women's national basketball team is the women's national basketball team of Costa Rica. It is managed by the  Federación Costarricense de Baloncesto Aficionado.

The team participated at the 2015 FIBA COCABA Championship for Women.

In mid-2018, the team played against the Queen's Golden Gaels, which Costa Rica ceded 42–66.

See also 
 Costa Rica men's national basketball team
 Costa Rica women's national under-19 basketball team
 Costa Rica women's national under-17 basketball team
 Costa Rica women's national 3x3 team

External links
Official website
Archived records of Costa Rica team participations
Latinbasket.com - Costa Rica Women National Team

References

Women's national basketball teams
Basketball in Costa Rica
Basketball teams in Costa Rica
National sports teams of Costa Rica